Personal Computer Games was a multi-format UK computer games magazine of the early/mid-1980s published by VNU.

History
Personal Computer Games was launched in July 1983.

The magazine was part of VNU and had its headquarters in London. The second issue was published on 28 October 1983 with the magazine going monthly from February 1984.

Computer coverage at the time were mainly consisted of the Spectrum, C64 and the BBC Micro, although there were others featured such as Atari 8-bit, Electron, Vic 20 and the newly released Amstrad CPC.

The February 1985 issue was the last of the magazine. Chris Anderson and Bob Wade went on to launch the Commodore 64 magazine Zzap!64.

Screen Test
One of the sections of the magazine was the 'Screen Test' pages where the latest games were reviewed. The PCG Panel, who voiced their opinions on the games reviews, consisted of the PCG staff plus several contributions from readers. The review was laid out with an explanation of the gameplay and then three opinions from the reviewers were given in boxouts at the end. PCG Ratings were out of ten, with a score giving to the graphics, sound, originality, lasting interest and the overall score.

Game of the Month
The highest accolade awarded by Personal Computer Games was the "Game of the Month" (First introduced in issue 3), issue 1 did not have a Game of the Month. Issue 2's Game of the month was actually called the "Screen Star" award.
 Summer 1983(Issue 1) No Game of the month awarded.
 January 1984(Issue 2): Manic Miner (ZX Spectrum) - "Screen Star" award.
 February 1984(Issue 3): Revenge of the Mutant Camels (Commodore 64)
 March 1984(Issue 4): Scuba Dive (ZX Spectrum)
 April 1984 (Issue 5): Forbidden Forest (video game) (Commodore 64)
 May 1984(Issue 6): Jet Set Willy (ZX Spectrum)
 June 1984(Issue 7): Fortress (1984 video game) (BBC Micro)
 July 1984(Issue 8): Loco (video game) (Commodore 64)
 August 1984(Issue 9): The Lords of Midnight (ZX Spectrum)
 September 1984(Issue 10): Quo Vadis (1984 video game) (Commodore 64)
 October 1984(Issue 11): Ancipital (Commodore 64)
 November 1984(Issue 12): Pyjamarama (ZX Spectrum)
 December 1984(Issue 13): Boulder Dash (Commodore 64)
 January 1985(Issue 14): Underwurlde and Knight Lore (both ZX Spectrum)
 February 1985(Issue 15): Impossible Mission (Commodore 64)

Cover mounts
In February 1984 PCG gave away a cover-mounted FlexiDisc containing game data that could be transferred to cassette. These included free programs for the Vic 20, Spectrum, BBC and Dragon 32/64 computers.

See also
 Zzap!64
 Computer and Video Games (magazine)

References

External links
Archived Personal Computer Games Magazines on the Internet Archive

Bi-monthly magazines published in the United Kingdom
Monthly magazines published in the United Kingdom
Quarterly magazines published in the United Kingdom
Video game magazines published in the United Kingdom
Defunct computer magazines published in the United Kingdom
Magazines published in London
Magazines established in 1983
Magazines disestablished in 1985